American Presbyterian Church may refer to:

American Presbyterian Church (founded 1979), a denomination that separated from the Bible Presbyterian Church
Presbyterian Church (USA), founded 1983, the largest contemporary national Presbyterian denomination
Presbyterian Church in America, founded 1973, the second-largest contemporary national Presbyterian denomination
Presbyterian Church in the United States (1861–1983), a denomination that was mainly active in the Southern and border states
Presbyterian Church in the United States of America (1789–1958), the first national Presbyterian denomination
Presbyterian Church of America, the former name of the Orthodox Presbyterian Church

See also
Presbyterianism in the United States
List of Presbyterian and Reformed denominations in North America
:Category:Presbyterian denominations in North America